Aminopropionitrile, also known as β-aminopropionitrile (BAPN), is an organic compound with both amine and nitrile functional groups. It is a colourless liquid.  The compound occurs naturally and is of interest in the biomedical community.

Biochemical and medical occurrence
BAPN is the toxic constituent of peas from Lathyrus plants, e.g., lathyrus odoratus. Lathyrism, a disease known for centuries, encompasses 2 distinct entities: a disorder of the nervous system (neurolathyrism) leading to limb paralysis, and a disorder of connective tissue, causing either bone deformity (osteolathyrism) or aortic aneurisms (angiolathyrim). BAPN causes osteolathyrism and angiolathyrism when ingested in large quantities." It can cause osteolathyrism, neurolathyrism, and/or angiolathyrism.

It is an antirheumatic agent in veterinary medicine.

It has attracted interest as an anticancer agent.

Production
Aminopropionitrile is prepared by the reaction of ammonia with acrylonitrile.

See also
 Kashin-Beck disease
 Lysyl oxidase
 Marfan syndrome

References

Amines
Nitriles